Segundo Durandal (17 March 1912 — 12 January 1976) was a Bolivian football defender.

Club career
His career in club football was spent in Club San Josè between 1930 and 1938.

International career 
During his career he has made two appearances for the Bolivia national football team at the 1930 FIFA World Cup.

References

External links

1912 births
1976 deaths
Place of birth missing
Bolivian footballers
Bolivia international footballers
1930 FIFA World Cup players
Association football defenders
Club San José players